Casely (born Jean-Carlos Casely 30 November 1985) is an American (son of Trinidadian and Panamanian parents) singer from Miami, Florida. In 2005, he released his debut album I'll Be on the 1st Records label. The album caught the attention of the Diaz Brothers, who signed him to their own division of Epic Records in 2007. His second album, 1985, was in development in 2008 but never released; its lead-off single, "Emotional" (written/produced by Casely), was released in February 2008 and entered the Billboard Hot R&B/Hip-Hop Songs charts. He signed to Ultra Records in 2011–2012 with the release of his single "Neva Fall". In 2014, Casely and his band, Casely and the Jank, released their EP "Brick: the Collection 2014". In 2020, Casely released a series of singles, including "Nena" with Red Rat, "Hillbilly Drip", "1985" with D*L*P*, "Touch Me", "Time Flies", "George", and his recent double "Never Be Alone/Rude Boy Summer" with Braveboy.

Discography

Albums
2005: I'll Be (debut album) 
2008: 1985 (major label – unreleased)
2014: Brick: The Collection 2014 – Casely and the Jank  (debut EP)

Solo singles

Featured songs
Na Na (Baby Bash featuring Casely)
Midnight (Pitbull featuring Casely)
Defend Dade (DJ Khaled featuring Pitbull & Casely)
Move, Shake, Drop (DJ Laz featuring Flo Rida, Casely & Pitbull)
Emotional (Remix) (DJ Static & Casely featuring Pitbull & Flo Rida)
Messy (B.Noza featuring Pitbull, Red Rat & Casely)
Pump That Like This (J-Cool featuring Casely)

References

External links
 

American contemporary R&B singers
Living people
Musicians from Fort Lauderdale, Florida
1985 births
21st-century American singers